The 2022 Oceania Rugby Women's Championship is the fourth edition of the Oceania Rugby Women's Championship. The competition will be held in Papakura and Pukekohe in New Zealand from 9 to 18 July. The tournament returns for the first time since 2019. It will be the first time that Papua New Guinea, Samoa and Tonga will play since 2020 and will provide Fiji with valuable preparation ahead of the 2021 Rugby World Cup.

The tournament will be played over three rounds at Massey Park and the Navigation Homes Stadium.

Fiji won their third championship title after beating Samoa 31–24 in a hard-fought match.

Teams 
Four women's teams will compete in the tournament. Papua New Guinea, Samoa and Tonga last played a test match in 2020.

Format 
The tournament will be played in a round-robin format over the course of nine days.

Table

Tournament

Round 1

Round 2

Round 3

References

External links 
 Oceania Rugby Official Site

2022 in women's rugby union
2022 in Oceanian rugby union
2022 in New Zealand sport
Oceania Rugby
Oceania Rugby Women's Championship
2022 in Fijian rugby union
2022 in Papua New Guinean sport
2022 in Samoan rugby union
2022 in Tongan rugby union
Oceania Rugby Women's Championship